The United States Post Office and Courthouse in Eureka, California is a courthouse of the United States District Court for the Northern District of California. Completed in 1910, this historic building was listed on the National Register of Historic Places in 1983. Its architecture, designed by James Knox Taylor, is mixed, reflecting several styles.  It initially served as a customhouse, in addition to being a courthouse and post office.

Murals
Notable examples of New Deal art were created for the building. Mining and Forestry and Water and Land, two tempera on canvas murals by Thomas Laman,  were commissioned in 1938 by the Treasury Relief Art Project and were on display in the post office until the building was sold to a private party in 2002. The murals were restored and are currently on display in the new McKinleyville, California Federal Courthouse.

See also  
List of United States post offices

References

External links

Eureka
Eureka
Federal courthouses in the United States
Courthouses in California
Government buildings completed in 1910
Custom houses in the United States
Buildings and structures in Eureka, California
National Register of Historic Places in Humboldt County, California
Treasury Relief Art Project
Custom houses on the National Register of Historic Places
Government buildings on the National Register of Historic Places in California